Gangway is a 1937 British musical film directed by Sonnie Hale and starring Jessie Matthews, Barry MacKay, Nat Pendleton and Alastair Sim. Its plot involves a young reporter goes undercover to unmask a gang of criminals who are planning a jewel heist. AKA as Sparkles in Australia and on Australian release 78rpm records. Jessie Matthews was nicknamed SPARKLE in the film.

Plot
Newspaper film critic Pat Wayne (Jessie Matthews) boards an ocean liner to New York to interview glamorous movie star Nedda Beaumont (Olive Blakeney). Once aboard, Pat somehow gets mixed up with a gangster (Nat Pendleton), and a Scotland yard inspector (Barry MacKay), who both mistake her for a female jewel thief called "Sparkle."

Main cast
 Jessie Matthews as Pat Wayne
 Barry MacKay as Bob Deering
 Nat Pendleton as Smiles Hogan
 Alastair Sim as Detective Taggett
 Olive Blakeney as Nedda Beaumont
 Noel Madison as Mike Otterman
 Patrick Ludlow as Carl Freemason
 Liane Ordeyne as Greta Brand
 Graham Moffatt as Joe
 Danny Green as Shorty
 Edmon Ryan as Red Mike
 Lawrence Anderson as Tracy - Press Agent
 Blake Dorn as Benny the Gent
 Peter Gawthorne as Assistant Commissioner Sir Brian Moore
 Henry Hallett as Smithers - Solicitor
 Warren Jenkins as Foreign Dancer
 Michael Rennie as Ship's Officer
 Doris Rogers as Mrs. Sherman Van Tuyl

Critical reception
In a contemporary review, The Monthly Film Bulletin wrote, "There is less, and less elaborate, singing and dancing than in previous Jessie Matthews' films, but the slight story is amusingly developed, the dialogue is good, Jessie Matthews herself gives a very good light comedy performance and the film as a whole scores on its comedy, and on its burlesque of American gangsters rather than on its music. Nat Pendleton and Noel Maddison are good as the tough gangsters and Alistair Sim as a very secret detective walks away with the picture in the few short scenes in which he appears. Barry Mackay gives a pleasing light performance and keeps the romance in the right key". Writing for Night and Day in 1937, Graham Greene gave the film a mixed review, complaining of the "pitiably amateurish direct[ion]" and the writing as "hardly distinguished". Greene praised the acting of Sim, but concluded that "the best one can say of Gangway is that it is better than [Hale's] previous picture". More recently, the BFI Screenonline wrote, "it is one of the more enjoyable Matthews vehicles and is fast moving enough to please most audiences."

References

External links

1937 films
British musical comedy films
1937 musical comedy films
Films directed by Sonnie Hale
Films shot at Pinewood Studios
Films set in London
British films set in New York City
Seafaring films
British crime comedy films
British black-and-white films
1930s English-language films
1930s crime comedy films
1930s British films